Heksebreen ("The Witch Glacier") is a glacier in Oscar II Land at Spitsbergen, Svalbard. It has a length of about 3.5 kilometers, and is a tributary glacier to Eidembreen. The glacier is located south in the mountainous district of Trollheimen, and is surrounded by the mountains of Heksefjellet, Runebomma, Trollungen and Stortrollet.

References

Glaciers of Spitsbergen